The North Texas Mean Green football statistical leaders are individual statistical leaders of the North Texas Mean Green football program in various categories, including passing, rushing, receiving, total offense, defensive stats, and kicking. Within those areas, the lists identify single-game, single-season, and career leaders. The Mean Green represent the University of North Texas in the NCAA Division I FBS Conference USA through the 2022 season, after which UNT will join the American Athletic Conference.

Although North Texas began competing in intercollegiate football in 1913, the school's official record book considers the "modern era" to have begun in 1950. Records from before this year are often incomplete and inconsistent, and they are generally not included in these lists.

These lists are dominated by more recent players for several reasons:
 Since 1950, seasons have increased from 10 games to 11 and then 12 games in length.
 The NCAA didn't allow freshmen to play varsity football until 1972 (with the exception of the World War II years), allowing players to have four-year careers.
 Bowl games only began counting toward single-season and career statistics in 2002. The Mean Green have played in five bowl games since this decision and will play a sixth in 2022, giving many recent players an extra game to accumulate statistics.
 Conference USA has held a championship game since 2005. North Texas played in this game twice (2017 and 2022), giving players in each season yet another game to amass statistics. UNT's future home of the American Athletic Conference also holds a championship game, giving future Mean Green players the chance for an extra game.
 Due to COVID-19 issues, the NCAA ruled that the 2020 season would not count against the athletic eligibility of any football player, giving everyone who played in that season the opportunity for five years of eligibility instead of the normal four.

Passing

Passing yards

Passing touchdowns

Rushing

Rushing yards

Rushing touchdowns

Receiving

Receptions

Receiving yards

Receiving touchdowns

Total offense
Total offense is the sum of passing and rushing statistics. It does not include receiving or returns.

Total offense yards

Total touchdowns

Defense

Interceptions

Tackles

Sacks

Kicking

Field goals made

Field goal percentage

References

North Texas